The 2020 Campeonato Carioca de Futebol was the 117th edition of the top division of football in the state of Rio de Janeiro. The competition was organized by FERJ. It began on 22 December 2019 and ended on 15 July 2020. On 16 March 2020, FERJ suspended the Campeonato Carioca indefinitely due to the coronavirus pandemic in Brazil. The tournament resumed behind closed doors on 18 June 2020.

Flamengo, the defending champions, successfully defended their title after defeating Fluminense 3–1 on aggregate to win their 36th Campeonato Carioca title.

Champions Flamengo, runners-up Fluminense, Taça Independência winners Volta Redonda, Torneio Extra winners Boavista and Torneio Extra runners-up Madureira qualified for 2021 Copa do Brasil. The top three teams not competing in any level of the national Campeonato Brasileiro, Boavista, Madureira and Bangu, qualified for the 2021 Campeonato Brasileiro Série D.

At the end of the tournament, only one club was relegated to 2020 Campeonato Carioca Série B1. Originally, the relegated team Nova Iguaçu obtained an injunction from the Tribunal de Justiça Desportiva do Futebol do Estado do Rio de Janeiro (TJD/RJ) that guaranteed their presence in the 2021 Campeonato Carioca First Round, but the Superior Tribunal de Justiça Desportiva (STJD) overturned the decision and Nova Iguaçu were relegated to 2020 Série B1.

Participating teams

Format
The competition format was similar to the previous three editions but with some alterations to each stage.

First round
The preliminary phase of the tournament was contested as a round-robin among the two worst-placed teams of the 2019 competition, the two best-placed teams in the 2019 relegation group, and the two teams promoted from the 2019 Série B1. The top two teams of the preliminary phase qualify for the main competition while the remaining four compete in the relegation round.

Relegation round
Unlike the previous format, only one team participating in the Campeonato Carioca would be relegated. The four lowest placed teams in the preliminary round form Group X and play a double round-robin. The first placed team avoid relegation and qualify for the preliminary phase of the 2021 Campeonato Carioca. The remaining three teams form Group Z and play another double round-robin. The lowest placed team would be relegated to the 2020 Campeonato Carioca Série B1.

Taça Guanabara and Taça Rio
In the main competition, the twelve clubs compete across two rounds in two groups of six. The first round is the Taça Guanabara and the second round is the Taça Rio. The two rounds have swapped formats from the 2019 Campeonato Carioca. 

In the Taça Guanabara, each team faces all six teams of the opposite group. the two top-placed teams in each group qualify for the semi-final of the Taça Guanabara. In the event of a draw, the higher placed team advances to the final. The Taça Guanabara final is contested as a single match. In case of a draw in the final, the match goes directly to a penalty shootout.

In the Taça Rio, each group contests a round-robin within their group. Like the Taça Guanabara, the top two teams in each group standing qualify to a semi-final with the same format.

Final
The final stage only is contested between two teams, as opposed to the four-team bracket of previous seasons. The winners of the Taça Guanabara and Taça Rio play the two-leg final. If tie on aggregate goals after both legs, the final is decided in a penalty shootout. If the same club wins both the Taça Guanabara and Taça Rio, and no other team has collected more points than this team across both group stages combined, then this team is immediately champion of the Campeonato Carioca. Otherwise, the team that won both cups and the team with the most points play a two-leg final. In the case of a draw on aggregate, the championship goes to the team that won both cups.

Taça Independência and Torneio Extra
The top two teams in the combined table of the Taça Guanabara and Taça Rio automatically qualify to the 2021 Copa do Brasil. Additionally, the best-placed team in the combined table that is not one of the "Big Four" of Rio de Janeiro (Botafogo, Flamengo, Fluminense, Vasco da Gama) wins the Taça Independência (Independence Cup) and also qualifies to the 2021 Copa do Brasil.

Originally, the four teams — excluding the "Big Four" and Taça Independência winners — with best overall performance (only considering matches against non-Big Four teams) would compete in the Torneio Extra (Extra Tournament): a single-elimination semi-finals and final bracket, with the winner receiving a berth to the 2021 Copa do Brasil. However the Torneio Extra was cancelled and the best seeded team was declared winners. As the 2020 Copa Rio was also cancelled, its 2021 Copa do Brasil berth was awarded to the Torneio Extra runners-up (second best seeded team).

First round
Nova Iguaçu and Macaé qualified from the 2019 Campeonato Carioca relegation playoff. Americano and Portuguesa were the two lowest placed teams in the 2019 Campeonato Carioca main tournament. Friburguense and America were promoted from the 2019 Campeonato Carioca Série B1. The First round was contested from 22 December 2019 to 11 January 2020.

Taça Guanabara
The Taça Guanabara group stage was contested from 18 January to 9 February.

Group A

Group B

Knockout stage

Semi-finals

Final
Home team was decided in a draw held on 14 February 2020, 14:00 at FERJ headquarters in Rio de Janeiro.

Taça Rio
The Taça Rio group stage was contested from 28 February to 2 July.

Group A

Group B

Knockout stage

Semi-finals

Final
Home team was decided in a draw held on 6 July 2020, 10:00 at FERJ headquarters in Rio de Janeiro.

Final stage

Final
Flamengo (winners of the Taça Guanabara) and Fluminense (winners of the Taça Rio) played the final on a home-and-away two-legged basis. As finalist with more points in the overall table, Flamengo earned the right to choose the order of the legs. Flamengo chose to be home team in the second leg.

Overall table
Bottom team of the overall table was "relegated" to 2021 Campeonato Carioca First Round. The "relegated" team Cabofriense, originally, obtained an injunction from TJD/RJ that guaranteed their presence in the 2021 Campeonato Carioca Championship Round, but STJD overturned the decision and Cabofriense were relegated to 2021 First Round.

Torneio Extra
As best-placed team in the overall table, excluding the "Big Four", Volta Redonda won the Taça Independência and qualified for the 2021 Copa do Brasil.

The four teams, excluding the "Big Four" and Taça Independência winners, with the best performance in the tournament (excluding matches against the "Big Four" teams) would compete in the Torneio Extra (Extra Tournament) for a berth to the 2021 Copa do Brasil, but the Torneio Extra was cancelled. The best seeded team, Boavista, was declared winners and qualified for the 2021 Copa do Brasil. As the 2020 Copa Rio was cancelled, the Torneio extra runners-up, Madureira, also qualified for the 2021 Copa do Brasil.

Relegation Round
The Relegation Round was competed from 18 January to 4 July in two separate double round-robin groups. The top team of Group X qualified for the First Round of the 2021 Campeonato Carioca and the bottom three contested the Group Z relegation group. The lowest placed team was relegated to the 2020 Série B1. The top two teams of Group Z also qualified for the preliminary round of the 2021 Campeonato Carioca.

Nova Iguaçu were relegated to 2020 Campeonato Carioca Série B1. They, originally, obtained an injunction from TJD/RJ that guaranteed their presence in the 2021 Campeonato Carioca First Round, but STJD overturned the decision and Nova Iguaçu were relegated to 2020 Série B1.

Group X

Group Z

Awards

2020 Campeonato Carioca Team

Top goalscorers

References

Campeonato Carioca seasons
Carioca
Campeonato Carioca 2020